"Get a Move On!" is a song by English record producer and disc jockey Andrew Carthy under his alias Mr. Scruff, featuring Fingathing member, Sneaky, on bass. The song is featured as the third track from his second studio album, Keep It Unreal. It was first released as a three-track single on 1 May 1999, and then re-released on 6 August 2001 as a three-track single featuring "Ug" as its B-side. The song samples "Bird's Lament" by Moondog, alongside vocals from T-Bone Walker's "Hypin' Woman Blues", and also contains samples of the song "That's the Blues" by Rubberlegs Williams.

Track listing

1999 single 
Vinyl release

"Get a Move On!" – 7:32
"Do You Hear?" – 6:54
"Ambiosound" – 3:34

CD release
"Get a Move On!" (Radio Edit) – 3:26
"Do You Hear?" – 6:53
"Ambiosound" – 3:34
"Get a Move On!" – 7:32

2001 re-release 
Vinyl release
"Get a Move On!"
"Ug"
"Ug Beats"

CD release
"Get a Move On!" (Radio Edit)
"Ug"
"Get a Move On!"

Music video 

The music video for "Get a Move On!" was featured on the CD release of the 2001 single as part of its enhanced CD feature. The music video features frames of Carthy's drawings in sepia tone. Elements of the music video include repeating segments, three-dimensional animation, wavy-like animation, beat synchronization, film-like effects, and unique angles. The video is directed by Carthy and Warren Edmond.

Charts

References 

1999 singles
2001 singles